Boca Juniors Femenino is the women's football team of Argentine sports club Boca Juniors. Established in 1990, it has been the leading force in the Campeonato de Fútbol Femenino since the late 1990s, having won 25 editions of the competition, including a five-years streak winning both the Apertura and Clausura championships. Former men's squad player Román Riquelme is in charge of the section since the beginning of 2020.

Boca Juniors has made five appearances in the Copa Libertadores Femenina from 2010 to 2014, reaching 3rd place in 2010. Boca is the first Argentine team to reach the final of the competition, winner silver medal in 2022.

During 2015 Boca Juniors played the inaugural Supercopa Argentina de Fútbol Femenino and on the final defeated San Lorenzo 2–1 to become the 1st Supercopa Argentina champions.

On 9 March 2019, Boca Juniors played officially in La Bombonera (stadium for the men's team) for the first time. It defeated Lanús 5–0. The historic first goal was scored by Yamila Rodríguez.

History 
The women's football section of Boca Juniors was created in 1990. One year later, with the establishment of a league, Boca Juniors began to participate in official competitions. In the first edition, Boca finished 2nd to champion River Plate. The first Primera División title was won in 1992.

The team did not won a title until 1998, starting with a successful era that reached its peak from 2003 to 2008 where Boca JUniors won a record-10 consecutive championships, becoming a leading force of the competition. In 2010, Boca Juniors played their first Copa Libertadores Femenina ever, where the team finished 3rd. (of 10), having reached the semifinal where the squad was beat by Brazilian Santos. Andrea Ojeda was the topscorer of the team with 5 goals.

When women's football became professional in Argentina in 2019, 21 Boca Juniors players signed their first contracts in August. Another landmark in Boca Juniors women's was on March 19, 2019, when the team played a match at La Bombonera for the first time, following a club's initiative to commemorate the International Women's Day. The match was held in the round 5th of the 2019 championship, with Boca easily defeating Lanús 5–0.

On January 19, 2021, Boca won their 24th. Primera División title (and the first in professional era) after easily beating arch-rival River Plate 7–0. Coached by Christian Meloni, the starting line-up was: Laurina Oliveros; Julieta Cruz, Florencia Quiñones, Noelia Espíndola, Eliana Stábile; Lorena Benítez, Clarisa Huber, Fabiana Vallejos; Carolina Troncoso, Andrea Ojeda, Yamila Rodríguez. The goals were scored by Huber, Rodríguez, Benítez, Vallejos (2), Ojeda (2).

Current squad 
As of 19 Jan 2021

Copa Libertadores record

Honours
 Campeonato de Fútbol Femenino (25): 1992, 1998, 1999, 2000, 2001 Ap, 2002 Cl, 2003 Ap, 2004 Cl, 2004 Ap, 2005 Cl, 2005 Ap, 2006 Cl, 2007 Ap, 2007 Cl, 2007 Ap, 2008 Cl, 2009 Ap, 2010 Ap, 2011 Cl, 2011 Ap, 2012 Ap, 2013 Cl, 2013 In, 2020 Tr, 2021 Cl, 2022
 Supercopa Argentina de Fútbol Femenino (1): 2015 
Súper Final (1): 2021

References

External links

 
 Fútbol Femenino on Planeta Boca Juniors

Women's football clubs in Argentina
Boca Juniors
Association football clubs established in 1990
1990 establishments in Argentina